Ty G. Allushuski (born May 23, 1986) is a former sports writer, editor, publisher, and expert in the field of social media communications. He served as assistant director of admissions at The University of Mississippi, in Oxford, Mississippi. He currently works in communications for Maven, a mobility startup and wholly owned subsidiary of General Motors in Detroit, Michigan.

Prior to returning to his alma mater to work in Higher Education, Allushuski was the sports editor of The Lamar Times and The Petal News, a pair of weekly newspapers in Hattiesburg, Mississippi. Allushuski's most famous work was "Rebs' depth up in smoke," which detailed a disciplinary cover-up involving the University of Mississippi football team and former head coach Ed Orgeron. He is also noted for the viral photograph he took of former Ole Miss offensive lineman Terrell Brown.

Previously, Allushuski worked as an editor and contributor for the fantasy sports web site, RotoExperts.com. He served as sports editor of The Oxford Enterprise, a weekly newspaper serving Oxford, Miss., and the surrounding Lafayette County area. He was also the owner and publisher of the former ESPN-affiliate Web site, InsideTheGrove.com.

Allushuski's sports writing career began while a student at the University of Mississippi. He covered Ole Miss sports as both a beat writer and columnist for the school's newspaper, The Daily Mississippian.

Between his sophomore and junior years, he interned at USA Today and wrote stories on the College World Series, the NFL and many different prep sports, among other topics. He later signed a freelance agreement with the paper to write a piece on former NFL quarterback Joe Montana that never actually ran. Allushuski worked at The Birmingham News as a post-graduate intern and mainly covered prep sports in Shelby County in suburban Birmingham, Alabama. He also assisted with the paper's coverage of Alabama and head coach Nick Saban during the Crimson Tide's rise to No. 1 nationally in the fall of 2008. Allushuski was the lead golf writer for the newspaper, and covered the 2008 U.S. Junior Amateur Championship at Shoal Creek that featured Jordan Spieth, Patrick Reed and Emiliano Grillo, among others.

Allushuski has been published on SI.com, Rivals.com, Scout.com, ESPN.com and in newspapers The Houston Chronicle, The Newark Star-Ledger, The Baton Rouge Advocate, and The Jackson (Miss.) Clarion-Ledger.

References

1986 births
Living people
People from Hattiesburg, Mississippi
American sportswriters
University of Mississippi alumni
Writers from Mississippi
Journalists from Mississippi